Wang Hesheng may refer to:

Wang Hesheng (composer) (born 1955), Chinese composer
Wang Hesheng (politician) (born 1961), Chinese politician